Fernando Ambrosio Méndez Chiquelli (born 4 August 1984) was an Argentine professional footballer who played as a midfielder.

Honours
San Marcos de Arica
Primera B: 2012

External links
 
 

1984 births
Living people
Argentine footballers
Association football midfielders
Quilmes Atlético Club footballers
Club Almagro players
Club Atlético Douglas Haig players
C.D. Antofagasta footballers
Cobreloa footballers
Primera B de Chile players
Chilean Primera División players
Argentine expatriate footballers
Argentine expatriate sportspeople in Chile
Expatriate footballers in Chile
People from Santa Cruz Province, Argentina